Stenalia dzhulfae is a beetle in the genus Stenalia of the family Mordellidae. It is found only in Azerbaijan. It was described in 2001 by Odnosum.

References

dzhulfae
Beetles described in 2001
Endemic fauna of Azerbaijan